Abdulrahman Al-Shanar (born 5 August 1998) is a Saudi Arabian professional footballer who plays for Al-Shaeib as a winger.

Career
Al-Shanar signed his first with five-year contract with Al-Nassr on 26 January 2018 . On 20 February 2019, Al-Shanar signed for Al-Raed on loan from Al-Nassr. On 25 August 2019, Al-Shanar signed for Al-Kawkab on loan from Al-Nassr. On 3 August 2021, Al-Shanar joined Al-Jeel on loan.

References

External links 
 

1998 births
Living people
Saudi Arabian footballers
Al Nassr FC players
Al-Raed FC players
Al-Kawkab FC players
Al-Diriyah Club players
Al Jeel Club players
Al Shaeib Club players
Saudi Professional League players
Saudi First Division League players
Saudi Second Division players
Association football wingers